Edward Oliver may refer to:
Edward C. Oliver, member of the Minnesota Senate
Edward George Hudson Oliver, South African botanist and author
Ed Oliver (golfer) (Edward Stewart Oliver Jr.), American golfer

See also

Ed Oliver (disambiguation)